Young Ideas is a 1943 American romantic comedy film directed by Jules Dassin and starring Susan Peters, Herbert Marshall and Mary Astor.

Plot
Josephine Evans and Professor Michael Kingsley are in a romantic relationship, something not approved of by Evan's two children. They try to disrupt the relationship with salacious incidents taken from their mother's fiction books, presenting them as true things their mother has done, hoping Kingsley would be displeased.

Cast

References

External links

1943 films
1943 romantic comedy films
American romantic comedy films
American black-and-white films
1940s English-language films
Films directed by Jules Dassin
Metro-Goldwyn-Mayer films
1940s American films